Edmond Catefort (also named Edmundo Catefort or Edmundo Catfort) (29 August 1838 – 28 December 1912) was a French entrepreneur settled in Ecuador, who  participated in the economic and public live of Ecuador during the government of Eloy Alfaro (Liberal Revolution).

Biography

Catefort was born in 1838 in Sainte Foy la Grande, a commune in the Department of Gironde, Region of Aquitaine, southwestern France. At the age of 18 he travelled  to Valparaiso Chile in 1856. He settled in Quito where he married María Elina Velasco Fabara and had four children: Edmundo, Jorge, Francisco and Bertha.

He became a successful entrepreneur in  Ecuador, owning one of the watermills in the near south of Quito for grinding cereal grains.  Biographers of Eloy Alfaro, President of Ecuador, state that he stayed in Catefort´s "La Arcadia farm" the night of September 3, 1895 in the eve of his assumption to power.

Career

On November 6, 1899 Catefort, as secretary ad hoc designated by the Governor of the Province of Pichincha, confirmed the foundation of the town of Santo Domingo de los Colorados (Santo Domingo de los Tsáchilas, capital city of the Province of Santo Domingo de los Tsáchilas).

In 1905 he became Treasurer of the "Junta de Beneficencia de Quito", the  committee that begun to build the  Eugenio Espejo  Hospital,  and manage  several health care facilities in Quito including the oldest, San Juan de Dios Hospital. In 1906 he was appointed Chairman of the Quito County Council, and  became member of the Special Joint Committee for the construction of the water supply and sewage system of Quito.

In 1907 he became an associate member of the local trade chamber, Camara de Comercio, Agricultura e Industrias de Quito.

The Government of Ecuador contracted with  Catefort for the organization of a company, Compañía de los Ferrocarriles Agrícolas al Oeste, to build a 60-centimeter-gauge railway from Daule to Santo Domingo de los Colorados (230 kilometers) on December 30, 1907. However, the project was not executed due to lack of funding from the government.  He   also contracted for the construction of a railway from the port of Bahia de Caraquez to Chone province of Manabí in 1900. The  construction of this new railway started on July 20, 1909. The first train arrived at  Chone in June 1912 and operated in this route with four machines until the mid 1960s.

In 1909, President Alfaro also contracted with him to build the water supply and sewage system of Port Bahía de Caráquez, Manabí.

Catefort was buried in 1912 in Père Lachaise Cemetery in Paris.

References 

1838 births
1912 deaths
20th-century French businesspeople
French expatriates in Ecuador
French industrialists